is the seventh studio album by Japanese entertainer Miho Nakayama. Released through King Records on July 11, 1988, the album was Nakayama's second release after One and Only to not feature any singles. The album cover is a painting of Nakayama in a bikini by Robert Blue; it was also used as the jacket cover of the single "Mermaid".

"Long Distance to the Heaven" was written by Nakayama (under her pseudonym "Mizuho Kitamura") in memory of friend Yasuko Endō, who committed suicide on March 30, 1986. The song was originally titled , but it was retitled after Endō's debut single "In the Distance" was cancelled due to her death.

The album peaked at No. 2 on Oricon's albums chart and sold over 252,000 copies.

Track listing 
All music is arranged by Takao Sugiyama, except where indicated.

Personnel
 Miho Nakayama – vocals
 Yōichirō "Iseley" Kakizaki – synthesizer (A1–2), electric piano (A2), Fender Rhodes (B2)
 Takao Sugiyama - synthesizer (except A4), drum programming (A2, A5–6), bass (A5)
 Ichirō Hada - guitar (A1–6, B1, B3–4), drum programming (A1)
 Hiroshi Narumi – acoustic guitar (B2)
 Kitarō – bass (A1–4, B1–5), synthesizer (A6), drums (B1), backing vocals (B4)
 Kaoru Abe – drums (A3, B2–4)
 "Kimuchi" Kimura – percussion (A4, B2, B4)
 Toshihiko Furumura – saxophone (A3)
 Amazons – backing vocals (except B1–2, B6)
 Tomoko Yoshikawa
 Kumi Saitō
 Yūko Ōtaki
 Darek Jackson – backing vocals (A4)
 Yoshie "Cherry" Shimizu – backing vocals (A4)
 Cindy – backing vocals (B1–2)
 Mine Matsuki – backing vocals (B1–2)
 Michael Wilson – backing vocals (B1–2)

Charts
Weekly charts

Year-end charts

References

External links
 
 
 

1988 albums
Miho Nakayama albums
Japanese-language albums
King Records (Japan) albums